A Tribute to My Friends is a 1983 album by Oscar Peterson.

Track listing
 "Blueberry Hill" (Vincent Rose, Al Lewis, Larry Stock) – 4:41
 "Sometimes I'm Happy (Sometimes I'm Blue)" (Clifford Grey, Leo Robin, Vincent Youmans) – 6:28
 "Stuffy" (Coleman Hawkins) – 5:53
 "Birk's Works" (Dizzy Gillespie) – 2:37
 "Cotton Tail" (Duke Ellington) – 3:12
 "Lover Man (Oh Where Can You Be?)" (Jimmy Davis, Roger ("Ram") Ramirez, James Sherman) – 5:22
 "A-Tisket, A-Tasket" (Van Alexander, Ella Fitzgerald) – 4:26
 "Rockin' Chair" (Hoagy Carmichael) – 5:32
 "Now's the Time" (Charlie Parker) – 7:20

Personnel

Performance
 Oscar Peterson – piano
 Joe Pass – guitar
 Niels-Henning Ørsted Pedersen – double bass
 Martin Drew – drums

References

1983 albums
Oscar Peterson albums
Albums produced by Norman Granz
Pablo Records albums